Gerard "Gerry" Hutch is an Irish criminal. He was the prime suspect for two of the biggest armed robberies in Irish history. Known for leading a "disciplined, ascetic lifestyle" since leaving prison in 1985, he was nicknamed "The Monk" by Veronica Guerin, an investigative journalist who was assassinated in 1996.

Early life
Born in central Dublin, his criminal career began at the age of 10. At some point in the 1970s, Hutch joined the Bugsy Malone Gang of inner city youngsters (named for the Bugsy Malone film), which he later led, and whose crimes included "jump-overs" - jumping over bank counters, grabbing cash and running.

He was later part of a gang involved in major robberies and received many convictions between 1970 and 1983 intermittently spending time in prison. His gang was said to have amassed an estimated IR£40 million from a series of bank robberies, jewellery heists, and fraud scams spanning almost eight years. Hutch has also been awarded money from legal actions in Irish courts.  These included £8,500 won from Securicor Ireland in June 1991, £2,000 from the Sunday Tribune newspaper in a libel action and around £26,000 won in legal actions against the Irish state.

Hutch admitted to being a "convicted criminal" in a 2008 interview with The Independent, but insisted that he made his money through property deals, not crime.

Corinthians Boxing Club 
In 1998 he was a founding member of the Corinthians Boxing Club in Dublin and has served as treasurer for the club. The club has a full gym and a boxing ring. The latter was donated by film director Jim Sheridan after making the film The Boxer.

Criminal Assets Bureau 
In 1999, in the course of court proceedings brought against Hutch by the Irish state's anti-money laundering agency, the Criminal Assets Bureau (CAB), Detective Chief Superintendent Felix McKenna stated that Hutch had been involved in the IR£1.7 million robbery of an armoured van at Marino Mart in January 1987 and the £3 million armed robbery of a Brinks Allied Security Depot in Clonshaugh, County Dublin, in 1995, which had been the largest cash robbery in the State at the time.

Hutch eventually reached an £1.2m settlement with the CAB to "cover back taxes and interest for a nine-year period".

Carry Any Body 
After the CAB settlement, Hutch applied for and was granted a taxi licence, and set up the limousine service Carry Any Body. The name is a humorous reference to the  Criminal Assets Bureau.

He has featured in the Irish media as he has driven celebrities including Mike Tyson on their visits to Ireland.

Film and television
Hutch is depicted in the film Veronica Guerin, played by Alan Devine. It is based on the life of the late Irish journalist Veronica Guerin who had  interviewed him.

Hutch appeared on RTÉ's Prime Time programme in March 2008 where he was interviewed about his life and criminal career. Hutch denied any criminal activity, since his last prison sentence, other than tax evasion.

Hutch was the subject of investigation in the Irish TV3 channel's television series, Dirty Money.  Episode 5, which aired March 2008 was solely devoted to the assets seized by the CAB from Hutch and the threat to seize assets from his family.

Family
He is an uncle of Gary Hutch, who was shot dead in September 2015 near Marbella, Andalusia, Spain. His brother Eddie Hutch Snr. was shot dead in North Strand Dublin in February 2016.

European Arrest Warrant
In April 2021, he became the subject of a European Arrest Warrant as Gardaí said they had enough evidence to charge him with murder in connection with the shooting of David Byrne. The EAW was issued after the Director for Public Prosecutions moved that he be charged with murder and tried before the Special Criminal Court. He is also likely to face other charges, such as attempted murder and possession of firearms. An investigation file was submitted by Garda detectives based in Ballymun to the DPP late in 2020. He was arrested in Spain in August 2021.

Extradition and charge
On 29 September 2021 he was extradited to Ireland, flown in a military CASA 235 from Madrid to Casement Aerodrome by the Irish Defence Forces. He was then taken to the Criminal Courts of Justice under armed Garda escort where he was charged with the murder of David Byrne before the Special Criminal Court. He was remanded in custody until 15 October at 10:30am. Other co-accused are to stand trial on 3 October 2022 and the state solicitor asked that he come in on that date, to which the three judges agreed.

Both Hutch and Jonathan Dowdall, who is also charged with the murder, claimed in judicial review before the High Court that trial before the Special Criminal Court would be unlawful and a breach of their fundamental rights because the court was acting as a permanent institution after being established on a temporary basis. These were dismissed by Mr Anthony Barr, who ruled that the legislation was neither temporary nor had any temporal limit. Both Hutch and Dowdall sought leave to appeal the High Court decision to the Supreme Court. On 5 May 2022 a panel reserved judgement in both cases. After a request from counsel for the Attorney General, the case was adjourned until 1 July 2022, pending the Supreme Court decision.

See also
 Hutch–Kinahan feud, an ongoing feud with the Kinahan family resulting in many deaths

References 

1963 births
Living people
20th-century Irish criminals
Articles blocked by Google
Criminals from Dublin (city)
Date of birth missing (living people)
Irish bank robbers
Irish male criminals
Irish gangsters
Taxi drivers
Hutch Organised Crime Group